Blackwood Brothers may refer to:

 Blackwood (publishing house), 1804–1980, a Scottish publisher and printer
 The Blackwood Brothers, an American southern gospel quartet